Korean law may refer to:
Gyeongguk Daejeon, the Joseon Dynasty code of law
Law of North Korea
Law of South Korea